Gharana (Family) is a 1961 Indian Hindi film that stars Raaj Kumar, Rajendra Kumar and Asha Parekh. It is directed by S. S. Vasan.  The film became a box office hit. The film was a remake of the 1960 Telugu film Shanthi Nivasam and remade in 1988 as Ghar Ghar Ki Kahani.

Cast
Raaj Kumar as Kailash
Rajendra Kumar as Kamal
Asha Parekh as Usha
Devika as Sita
Krishna Kumari as Sheela (Usha's step-mother)
Kanhaiyalal as Advocate Shyam Lal Gupta (Usha's father)
Bipin Gupta as Rai Bahadur Ramdas
Lalita Pawar as Shanta
Shubha Khote as Bhairavi
Agha as Sarang
Minoo Mumtaz as Ragini

Plot

The large household at the centre of the plot is run by a tyrannical old mother Shanta (Lalita Pawar).  Her husband Ramdas (Bipin Gupta) is a very religious, meek man who lets her boss everyone around in the home.  The home includes their eldest daughter-in-law Gauri, a widow, raising two little boys.  Their middle son is Kailash (Raaj Kumar), who is happily married to a very devoted, loving woman named Sita (Devika).  Their youngest son is Kamal (Rajendra Kumar), a college student, who falls in love with another student Usha (Asha Parekh).  The young married daughter Bhairavi (Shubha Khote), who was living with her husband and father-in-law, has now moved back home using a trivial reason, such as how she doesn't like her father-in-law's singing.  Her husband Sarang (Agha) has followed her and is staying in the household, trying his best to get his wife to come back to his home.  Shanta has completely spoiled her daughter.  One day, Bhairavi plants a suspicion in Kailash's head that Sita is having an affair with Kamal.  Even after Kamal's marriage to Usha, Kailash's suspicions grow to the point where he leaves his wife and attempts suicide.  His friend, a respectable dancer named Ragini (Minoo Mumtaz), stops him.  He accepts her help and later pursues her romantically, but she sees him only as a friend, as he is a married man.

One day, Kamal sees his mother about to hit Usha and stops her.  He also convinces his father Ramdas to tame his mother and take control of the household. Ramdas finally does that. He forces Bhairavi to return with Sarang to her in-laws.  Meanwhile, when Sita tells Kailash that she is pregnant, he rejects the notion that he is the father, claiming that Kamal fathered the child.  Sita vehemently denies these allegations.  Heartbroken, she attempts suicide but is stopped by other members of the family.  Bhairavi is forced to tell the truth about how she fabricated the story of Kamal having an affair with Sita.  Kailash now believes in Sita's fidelity and devotion and begs for her forgiveness.  She forgives him, and the entire family is now reunited and happy.

Songs
Ravi scored the music and Shakeel Badayuni wrote songs of the film.

Awards and nominations
 Filmfare Best Music Director Award--Ravi 
 Filmfare Best Lyricist Award—for the song "Husnwale Tera Jawab Nahin" by Shakeel Badayuni
 Filmfare Nomination for Best Supporting Actress--Shobha Khote
 Filmfare Nomination for Best Playback Singer--Mohammed Rafi for the song "Husnwale Tera Jawab Nahin"

References

External links
 

1960s Hindi-language films
1961 films
1961 drama films
Films directed by S. S. Vasan
Films scored by Ravi
Hindi remakes of Telugu films
Indian drama films
Hindi-language drama films